The 1964 United States Senate election in Vermont took place on November 3, 1964. Incumbent Republican Winston L. Prouty successfully ran for re-election to another term in the United States Senate, defeating Democratic candidate Frederick J. Fayette.

Republican primary

Results

Democratic primary

Results

General election

Results

See also 
 United States Senate elections, 1964

References

Vermont
1964
United States Senate